The 2014–15 season was UD Almería's 25th season of existence and the second consecutive in the top flight of Spanish football, after narrowly avoiding relegation in the last season.

Squad

Coaches

Staff members

Source: UD Almería's official website

Transfers

In

Total spending:  €200,000

Out

Total gaining:  €3,000,000

Contracts

Statistics

Appearances and goals 
Updated as of 30 May 2015.
 

|-
|colspan="12"|Players on loan to other clubs:

|-
|colspan="12"|Players who have left the club after the start of the season:

|}

Top scorers

Disciplinary record

Competitions

Pre-season/Friendlies

La Liga

Results summary

Results by round

Matches

Copa del Rey

References

Almeria
UD Almería seasons